Adventures of the Queen is a 1975 American made-for-television drama film starring Robert Stack. It was made as a pilot for a potential TV series but screened as a stand-alone TV movie.

Plot
The captain and doctor on a cruise liner have to deal with various crises, including a hidden bomb, a suicide attempt and a billionaire.

Cast
Robert Stack as Captain James Morgan
David Hedison as Dr Peter Brooks
Ralph Bellamy as J L Dundeen
Bradford Dillman as Martin Reed
Sorrell Booke as Robert Dwight
Burr DeBenning as Ted Trevor
John Randolph as John Howe
Ellen Weston as Ann Trevor
Linden Chiles as Matthew Evans
Sheila Matthews as Claudine Lennart
Mills Watson as Jim Greer
Frank Marth as Phillips

Production
It was the first of three movies Allen did for TV in the wake of the success of The Towering Inferno, the others being The Swiss Family Robinson and Time Travelers. Each was made through 20th Century Fox for $1 million but was done for different networks. They were all done as pilots for potential TV series.

"I missed television," said Allen. "There's a hysteria and an excitement in television that exists nowhere else in business."

Allen called the film "Son of Poseidon Adventure." It was mostly shot on the Queen Mary in Long Beach.

References

External links
Adventures of the Queen at IMDb
Adventures of the Queen at TCMDB
Adventures of the Queen at Irwin Allen

1975 television films
1975 films
1975 drama films
CBS network films
Films directed by David Lowell Rich
Films produced by Irwin Allen
Films scored by Richard LaSalle
Films with screenplays by John Gay (screenwriter)
20th Century Fox Television films
1970s English-language films
American drama television films
1970s American films